The following is a list of flags of Finland. For more information, see flag of Finland.

National flag

Presidential flag

Regent of Finland

Military flag

Navy

Air Force

Civil Maritime Flags

Diplomatic services flags

Customs Flags

Postal Flags

Vexillology Association flags

Regions

City and municipality flags

Pennants 

Finnish regions also have traditional Household pennants.

Political flags

Ethnic groups flags

Historical flags

Proposed flags

Finnish shipping companies

Finnish yacht clubs

Åland

Historical Åland flags

Proposed Åland flags

See also
 Flag of Finland
Household pennant
 Coat of arms of Finland

References

External links

 
Lists and galleries of flags
Nordic Cross flags
Flags